The Gold Ridge Fire Protection District is a special district governed by a board of directors, that provides fire protection and emergency medical services in the unincorporated areas of Sebastopol, California including; Hessel, Twin Hills, and Freestone. The district was formed in a merger and reorganization of the Twin Hills Fire District and the Hessel Fire District in 1993. Gold Ridge Fire Protection District had a memorandum of understanding with the Bennett Valley Fire Protection District (a separate special district also located in Sonoma County) which allowed for sharing of overhead and staff that lasted for approximately 22 years and ended in 2019. Gold Ridge Fire Protection District works in close coordination with its surrounding fire districts/departments and provides automatic and mutual aid for all types of incidents and station cover assignments.

Stations and apparatus
As of 2020, the district is home to three fire stations.

Gallery

References

Firefighting in California
Fire protection districts in the United States
1993 establishments in California
Government agencies established in 1993
Sebastopol, California
Government of Sonoma County, California